Iridium chloride can refer to:

 Iridium(III) chloride (iridium trichloride), IrCl3
 Iridium tetrachloride (iridium(IV) chloride), IrCl4
 Iridium dichloride (iridium(II) chloride), IrCl2